The Water Resources Act 1963 (1963 c.38) is an Act of the Parliament of the United Kingdom that continued the process of creating an integrated management structure for water, which had begun with the passing of the Land Drainage Act 1930. It created river authorities and a Water Resources Board. River authorities were responsible for conservation, re-distribution and augmentation of water resources in their area, for ensuring that water resources were used properly in their area, or were transferred to the area of another river authority. The river authorities covered the areas of one or more of the river boards created under the River Boards Act 1948, and inherited their duties and responsibilities, including those concerned with fisheries, the prevention of pollution, and the gauging of rivers. It did not integrate the provision of public water supply into the overall management of water resources, but it introduced a system of charges and licenses for water abstraction, which enabled the river authorities to allocate water to potential users. This included the water supply agencies, who now needed their supplies to be licensed.

Scope
The legislation made provision for a "first appointed day", on which the River Authorities would come into existence, and this was set on 15 October 1964, as a result of the River Authorities (First Appointed Day) Order 1964. A River Authorities (Second Appointed Day) Order 1964 established 1 April 1965 as the day on which the new authorities would take over the responsibilities of the previous River Boards, which would then cease to exist. The River Boards Act 1948, under which they had been established, was also repealed on that day. Under the new legislation, twenty-seven River Authorities replaced the 32 existing River Boards. As well as inheriting land drainage, fisheries and the prevention of pollution functions, the new authorities were given additional duties to monitor water quality and protect water resources. They thus became responsible for inland waters and the underground strata which existed within their area. The Act made special provision for the River Thames and Lee Conservancy Catchment Boards, enabling them to act as if they were River Authorities and their catchment areas were river authority areas. There was also special provision for parts of London, defined as the London excluded area under section 125 of the Act.

The Act consisted of 137 sections organised into ten parts. Part 1 outlined the functions of Ministers in relation to water resources. Part 2 dealt with the setting up of River Authorities and the Water Resources Board. Part 3 covered the assessment of water resources. Part 4 dealt with the abstraction and impounding of water, while part 5 dealt with charges for abstraction and impounding of water. The powers of River Authorities in relation to land were covered by part 6, while part 7 outlined additional functions of River Authorities. Part 8 dealt with financial considerations, part 9 detailed the transfer of undertakings of River Boards, and part 10 covered miscellaneous and supplementary provisions. This was followed by 14 schedules.

While the Water Act 1945 had introduced the concept of a national policy for water, it had not provided the means to achieve one, but this was addressed by the formation of the Water Resources Board. This was a national organisation, which was independent of central government, and was responsible for the collection of data, research, and planning. Although it had no statutory powers over the River Authorities, it influenced their actions through negotiation, and was very successful in this. It produced three major reports on water resources between 1966 and 1971, in which it foresaw the need for transfers of water between rivers, and in some cases, between regions. Its final report, Water Resources in England and Wales, published in early 1974, outlined strategies for ensuring an adequate water supply for the next 25 years. In the consultation leading up to the Water Act 1973, it was argued that the Water Resources Board should be empowered to undertake major projects in its own right, but when the Act was passed, the Board was disbanded and its functions were dispersed among other agencies.

The twenty-seven river authorities were detailed in schedule 1 of the Act.

Bibliography

References

United Kingdom Acts of Parliament 1963
Former nationalised industries of the United Kingdom
Water in the United Kingdom